The Cork Premier Senior Football Championship (known for sponsorship reasons as the Bon Secours Cork Premier Senior Hurling Championship and abbreviated to the Cork PSFC) is an annual club Gaelic football competition organised by the Cork County Board of the Gaelic Athletic Association and contested by the top-ranking senior clubs and amalgamated teams in the county of Cork in Ireland, deciding the competition winners through a group and knockout format. It is the most prestigious competition in Cork Gaelic football.

Introduced in 1887 as the Cork Senior Football Championship, it was initially a straight knockout tournament open only to senior-ranking club teams, with its winner reckoned as the Cork county champion. The competition took on its current name in 2020, adding a round-robin group stage for clubs and limiting the number divisional entrants to the championship proper.

In its present format, the Cork Premier Senior Championship begins with a preliminary qualifying round for the divisional teams and educational institutions. The sole surviving team from this stage automatically qualified for the knockout phase. The 12 club teams are drawn into three groups of four teams and play each other in a single round-robin system. The three group winners, three runners-up and three third-placed teams proceed to the knockout phase that culminates with the final match at Páirc Uí Chaoimh in October. The winner of the Cork Premier Senior Championship, as well as being presented with the Andy Scannell Cup, qualifies for the subsequent Munster Club Championship. In 2020, the intended format was disrupted and slightly amended due to the impact of the COVID-19 pandemic on Gaelic games.

The competition has been won by 29 teams, 19 of which have won it more than once. Nemo Rangers are the most successful team in the tournament's history, having won it 23 times. Nemo Rangers have established themselves as the dominant force in Cork football by winning 23 county finals out of the 27 they have been in. Nemo Rangers are the reigning champions, having beaten St Finbarr's by 1-16 to 2-09 in the 2022 final.

History

19th century
Following the foundation of the Gaelic Athletic Association in 1884, new rules for Gaelic football and hurling were drawn up and published in the United Irishman newspaper. Throughout 1886, county committees were established, with the Cork County Board affiliating on 19 December 1886. Plans to hold championships in both hurling and football were drawn up over the following weeks, with an advert inviting teams to enter appearing in the Cork Examiner on 15 January 1887. The cost of entering a team was 2s 6d and the closing date for entries was 29 January 1887. The championship draw took place at 23 Maylor Street on the day after the closing date and "the utmost good feeling was displayed, and...the contesting parties were agreeably satisfied" as the draw took place. Seven clubs entered: Blarney (who later withdrew), Carrignavar, Emmets, Glanmire, Lees, Lisgoold, Midleton.

All of the matches in the inaugural championship took place at a special enclosure in Cork City Park, with the first match taking place "in the presence of several thousand persons" on 6 March 1887. Mr. J. E. Kennedy acted as referee and Messrs E. Cotter and W. Sheehan performed the duties of goal umpires. That game between Lees and Emmets was described in the Cork Examiner as being "closely contested", however, it was "not characterized [sic] by any particularly brilliant play" and ended in a scoreless draw. The replay two weeks later saw Lees record the first championship victory after a 1-02 to no score win over Emmets. The final first-round game between Lisgoold and Midleton also ended in a draw, however, it became the first ever championship match to feature extra-time when two fifteen-minute periods were played after the initial hour. The first final to be played took place on 10 July 1887, with Lees beating Lisgoold by 0-04 to 0-01. They later went on to represent Cork in the first All-Ireland Championship.

The 1888 championship saw an increase in the number of participating teams to 27 from 25 different clubs, with Midleton and Lisgoold also fielding second teams. In an effort to cut down on travel costs for clubs, the County Board adopted a divisional structure to the championship. The participating teams were divided into seven divisions along geographic lines; Cork City, East Cork, Mid Cork, North Cork, North-East Cork, South Cork and West Cork. Tracton were the only representatives from South Cork. The six divisional champions and Tracton, as the sole South Cork representatives, qualified for the county-wide series of games.

Towards the end of 1888, a serious split in the Association in Cork lead to the existence of three rival and distinct county boards. 40 clubs left the official board and affiliated to the Cork Board, under the presidency of Fr. O'Connor, and the O'Brien Board under the presidency of Fr. Carver. These three boards ran their own separate championships over the following two seasons, however, the Cork County Board remained as the official administrative branch of the GAA. In 1890, Midelton, as official county champions, became the first Cork representatives to win the All-Ireland Championship. The three individual boards unified under the banner of the Cork County Board in 1891, with the championship continuing to be run on a divisional basis. The championship reverted to a straight knock-out format in 1892, with the first and second teams being separated in the draw.

20th century

On 10 March 1907, the newly-built Cork Athletic Grounds hosted the final for the very first time. It remained as the regular final venue for the following 67 years. The War of Independence (1919-1921) saw Cork take a prominent role, something which had an adverse effect on the smooth running of the championships. Civil unrest following a series of events, including the murder of Lord Mayor Tomás Mac Curtain, the death from hunger strike of Lord Mayor Terence MacSwiney and the burning of Cork at the height of the war, resulted in the cancellation of the championships in 1921 and 1922.

The first decades of the new century brought new teams but not in a traditional sense. Food production company Crosse & Blackwell, third level educational institution University College Cork (UCC) and Collins Military Barracks all entered teams, however, UCC are the only team to continue fielding a team as of 2020. The creation of the divisional boards in the late 1920s added a new dimension to the championship. These divisional teams were composed of junior and intermediate players and afforded every player in the county the chance of winning a senior championship medal. Beara became the first division to win the title when they beat Clonakilty in the 1932 final.

After 90 years of using the single-elimination straight knock-out format, problems arose regarding the standard of the competing teams. A special committee was established to examine the possibility of restructuring the championship format. At the County Convention on 5 February 1978, delegates voted by 138 to 83 in favour of abandoning the knock-out format and adopting a group stage. This format was used for three successive season from 1978 until 1980, with Nemo Rangers and St. Finbarr's becoming the first teams to win the championship after suffering a defeat. At the County Convention on 25 January 1981, it was decided to abandon the group stage format and introduce a new graded draw with divisional, rural and city clubs all being grouped individually. The winners of the first two groupings progressed to one semi-final, with two of the city teams qualifying for the other semi-final. The new format was introduced to guarantee a city-county pairing in the final. The County Board voted to revert to the single-elimination straight knock-out format in 1982.

In 1995, Cork Regional Technical College was permitted to field a team in the championship for the first time.

21st century

The introduction of a "back door" system at inter-county level in the All-Ireland Hurling Championship in 1997 led to the idea of introducing a second chance for defeated teams at county level. In 2000 a double-elimination format was introduced which afforded all club teams a second chance by remaining in the championship after a first-round defeat. In the two decades that followed the championship format continued to evolve with a number of minor tweaks. The provision of a second chance for defeated teams was later expanded to allow teams the opportunity of being defeated twice and still remain in the championship. The splitting of the intermediate grade in two resulted in the introduction of relegation in 2006, with Mallow and St. Michael's becoming the first teams to be relegated that year. Prior to this teams were allowed to decide for themselves if they wanted to regrade or retain their senior status.

Club dominance
City club Lees were the dominant force during the first thirty years of the championship. Between 1887 and 1914 they won ten championship titles before going into a period of decline. Their hegemony was closely followed by Fermoy who enjoyed their own golden era by winning six championships between 1895 and 1906. Lees city based rivals, Nils, also featured regularly in county finals and won six titles between 1894 and 1925.

Macroom joined the roll of honour by winning their first championship in 1909. Seven more titles followed up to 1935. After University College Cork made the breakthrough and dominated the 1920s, the following decade was dominated by divisional sides. Beara lead the way by claiming four championship titles between 1932 and 1940, while Duhallow and Carbery also won two championship titles at this time. Clonakilty made their own breakthrough by winning their first championship in 1939. It was the first of seven titles up to 1952. The rest of the decade belonged to St. Finbarr's, who became the first single-entity club to win championship titles in both hurling and Gaelic football. After a period in the doldrums, UCC were back as a dominant force by winning five championships between 1960 and 1973.

Since winning their first championship title in 1972, Nemo Rangers have gone on to dominate the championship. In the 45 years since then they have won a total of 21 championship titles. In spite of brief periods of dominance by other teams, most notably St. Finbarr's who won five titles between 1976 and 1985, Nemo Rangers have established themselves as the dominant force of Cork Gaelic football.

Formats used
For over 100 years the championship used a single elimination format. Each team was afforded only one defeat before being eliminated from the championship. The creation of the divisions in the 1920s added a new dimension to the championship. These divisional teams, which were composed of junior and intermediate players, competed in a preliminary section with the two winning teams advancing to the championship proper which retained its single elimination format. The introduction of a "back door" system at inter-county level in the All-Ireland Hurling Championship in 1997 lead to the idea of introducing a second chance for defeated teams at county level. In the twenty-year period from the late 1990s to 2017, the championship underwent a number of format changes. The provision of a second chance for defeated teams was later expanded to allow teams the opportunity of being defeated twice and still remain in the championship. The splitting of the intermediate grade in two resulted in the introduction of relegation in 2006. Prior to this teams were allowed to decide for themselves if they wanted to regrade or retain their senior status. In 2015 the championship once again reverted to a double elimination format.

Format

Current

Development
On 2 April 2019, a majority of 136 club delegates voted to restructure the championship once again. The new format led to the splitting of the championship in two and the creation of the Cork Premier Senior Championship and the Cork Senior A Championship.

Overview
Group stage: The 12 club teams are divided into three groups of four. Over the course of the group stage, which features one game in April and two games in August, each team plays once against the others in the group, resulting in each team being guaranteed at least three games. Two points are awarded for a win, one for a draw and zero for a loss. The teams are ranked in the group stage table by points gained, then scoring difference and then their head-to-head record. The top two teams in each group qualify for the quarter-finals.

Divisional and colleges section: University College Cork, Cork Institute of Technology and the divisional sides compete in a separate section, with one team qualifying for the knock-out stage.

Preliminary quarter-finals: Two lone preliminary quarter-finals feature the three third-placed teams from the group stage and the winners of the divisional and colleges section. Two teams qualify for the next round.

Quarter-finals: The four quarter-finals feature the six teams from the group stage and the two preliminary quarter-final winners. Four teams qualify for the next round.

Semi-finals: The two semi-finals feature four teams. Two teams qualify for the next round.

Final: The two semi-final winners contest the final. The winning team are declared champions.

Teams

2023 Teams

Clubs eligible for divisional teams

Sponsorship
TSB Bank became the first title sponsor of the championship, serving in that capacity until 2005 when the Evening Echo signed a sponsorship deal. In 2020, Bon Secours Hospital were unveiled as the new title sponsor of the Cork Premier Senior Championship.

Qualification for subsequent competitions
The Cork Premier Senior Football Championship winners qualify for the subsequent Munster Senior Club Football Championship. This place is reserved for club teams only as divisional and amalgamated teams are currently not allowed in the provincial championship. If a divisional side wins the Cork Championship then the runners-up, if they are a club team, qualify for the Munster Championship. This has occurred on several occasions.

Venues

Group stage

Fixtures in the group stage of the championship are usually played at a neutral venue that is deemed halfway between the participating teams. Some of the more common venues include Charlie Hurley Park, Brinny Sportsfield, Coachford Pitch, Sam Maguire Park and Rossa Park. All games in the knockout stage are played at either Páirc Uí Rinn or Páirc Uí Chaoimh.

Final
The final has been played at the rebuilt Páirc Uí Chaoimh since it opened in 2017. The rebuilding process meant that the finals of 2015 and 2016 were hosted at Páirc Uí Rinn. Continuing work on the pitch at the new stadium resulted in the 2019 final also being played at Páirc Uí Rinn. Prior to rebuilding, the final was hosted by the original Páirc Uí Chaoimh since it opened in 1976. The final was played at the Mardyke in 1974 and 1975, while in the 70 years prior to the development of Páirc Uí Chaoimh the final was usually played at the Cork Athletic Grounds. From the inaugural championship in 1887 up to the turn of the 20th century, the final was held at a variety of venues in the city and around the county, most notably the Cork Park enclosure.

Managers
Managers in the Cork Championship are involved in the day-to-day running of the team, including the training, team selection, and sourcing of players. Their influence varies from club-to-club and is related to the individual club committees. The manager is assisted by a team of two or three selectors and a backroom team consisting of various coaches.

Trophy
The winning team is presented with the Andy Scannell Cup. Andy Scannell, a teacher at Clondulane National School outside Fermoy, was a County Senior Football selector when Cork won the Sam Maguire in 1945. He was later Chairman of the North Cork Division before taking office as Cork County Chairman in the early '50s, and steered the county to All-Ireland hurling victory during his term.

Roll of honour

By Division

List of finals

Notes
 The following finals were drawn: 1901, 1944, 1949, 1952, 1953, 1957, 1967, 1968, 1994, 1997, 1999, 2017
 No scores known for 1899 and 1904
 1898 Objection and game awarded to Fermoy

Records and statistics

Final

Team
Most wins: 23:
Nemo Rangers (1972, 1974, 1975, 1977, 1978, 1981, 1983, 1987, 1988, 1993, 2000, 2001, 2002, 2005, 2006, 2007, 2008, 2010, 2015, 2017, 2019, 2020, 2022)
Most consecutive wins: 4:
Nemo Rangers (2005, 2006, 2007, 2008)
Most appearances in a final: 27
Nemo Rangers (1970, 1972, 1974, 1975, 1977, 1978, 1981, 1983, 1987, 1988, 1992, 1993, 1999, 2000, 2001, 2002, 2005, 2006, 2007, 2008, 2010, 2013, 2015, 2017, 2019, 2020, 2022)

Teams

By decade
The most successful team of each decade, judged by number of Cork Senior Football Championship titles, is as follows:
 1880s: 2 for Lees (1887–88)
 1890s: 3 for Fermoy (1895-98-99)
 1900s: 5 for Lees (1902-03-04-07-08)
 1910s: 3 for Macroom (1910-12-13)
 1920s: 3 for University College Cork (1920-27-28)
 1930s: 3 each for Macroom (1930-31-35) and Beara (1932-33-34)
 1940s: 5 for Clonakilty (1942-43-44-46-47)
 1950s: 3 for St. Finbarr's (1956-57-59)
 1960s: 4 for University College Cork (1960-63-64-69)
 1970s: 5 for Nemo Rangers (1972-74-75-77-78)
 1980s: 4 for Nemo Rangers (1981-83-87-88)
 1990s: 2 each for Duhallow (1990–91) and Bantry Blues (1995–98)
 2000s: 7 for Nemo Rangers (2000-01-02-05-06-07-08)
 2010s: 4 for Nemo Rangers (2010-15-17-19)

Successful defending
15 teams of the 29 who have won the championship have successfully defended the title. These are:
 Nemo Rangers on 8 attempts out of 18 (1975, 1978, 1988, 2001, 2002, 2006, 2007, 2008)
 Lees on 4 attempts out of 11 (1888, 1903, 1904, 1908)
 Macroom on 3 attempts out of 9 (1910, 1913, 1931)
 Clonakilty on 3 attempts out of 8 (1943, 1944, 1947)
 Fermoy on 3 attempts out of 6 (1899, 1900, 1906)
 University College Cork on 2 attempts out of 9 (1928, 1964)
 St. Finbarr's on 2 attempts out of 7 (1957, 1980)
 Beara on 2 attempts out of 5 (1932, 1934)
 Nils on 1 attempt out of 5 (1925)
 St. Nicholas' on 1 attempt out of 4 (1966)
 Castlehaven on 1 attempt out of 4 (2013)
 Duhallow on 1 attempt out of 2 (1991)
 Cobh on 1 attempt out of 1 (1919)
 Clondrohid on 1 attempt out of 1 (1892)
 Midleton on 1 attempt out of 1 (1890)

Gaps
 Top ten longest gaps between successive championship titles:
 54 years: Duhallow (1936-1990)
 44 years: Clonakilty (1952-1996)
 39 years: Fermoy (1906-1945)
 33 years: Carbery (1971-2004)
 32 years: Lees (1923-1955)
 32 years: University College Cork (1928-1960)
 31 years: Carbery (1937-1968)
 30 years: Beara (1967-1997)
 27 years: Beara (1940-1967)
 26 years: University College Cork (1973-1999)

Top scorers

All time

By year

In a single game

In finals

See also
 List of Cork Senior Football Championship winners

References

External links
Official Cork Website
Cork on Hoganstand
Cork Club GAA
Cork Senior County Finals

 
 1
Senior Gaelic football county championships